Optoro is a reverse logistics technology company that works with retailers and manufacturers to manage and then resell their returned and excess merchandise. These products, which range from consumer electronics to home goods to clothing, are automatically listed on online marketplaces, including Amazon, eBay, Buy.com, BestBuy. Optoro also liquidates goods in bulk through its other proprietary website.

History 
Optoro was founded as eSpot Deals in 2004 by Tobin "Toby" Moore while he was a student at Brown University. The business was initially run out of an attic above the garage at Moore's house before opening a 1,200-square-foot storefront in Georgetown. Moore and co-founder Adam Vitarello, now Optoro's president, opened one of the first eBay drop off stores in Washington, DC. In 2008, the pair opened an office and warehouse in Lanham, Maryland, where they processed goods from retailers. In 2010, eSpot Deals pivoted away from processing returns directly and incorporated as Optoro, Inc. Tobin and Adam were joined by CTO Jessica Szmajda, and built a new plan to deliver technology solutions to retailers to handle their returned and excess goods. In September 2013, Optoro moved its corporate headquarters to a 13,000-square-foot office in downtown Chinatown, D.C. In June 2016, Optoro moved again to an office space located in the Metro Center neighborhood of Washington, D.C. with double the square footage, holding around 160 people. In February 2021, Optoro shut down its direct-to-consumer eCommerce website, blinq.com.

Products and services 
Optoro's main product is a software-as-a-service called OptiTurn, which is used in retailers' warehouses to sort, process, and resell clients' returned and excess inventory. The software tracks and dispositions inventory as it flows through a warehouse until it reaches consumers. Using OptiTurn, workers mark the conditions of returned products as new, open box, refurbished, or used in good condition. OptiTurn analyzes this, along with other product information, to divert items to the channel that will get retailers the most money back. Possible dispositions include selling directly to consumers, reselling to wholesalers, returning to vendors for repair, donating, or recycling.

OptiTurn lists products with a high resale value automatically on multiple online marketplaces under the BLINQ brand. The software will disposition other goods that will net a higher recovery when sold in bulk to be resold under the BULQ brand on BULQ.com.

Environment 
In March 2015, Optoro started a dedicated sustainability team to measure the transportation and waste impacts of the returns industry and the effects that Optoro's solution has on retailers' carbon footprints.

Financing 
In July 2013, Optoro received $23.5 million in Series B funding from three primary investors: Revolution LLC, headed by former AOL executives Steve Case, Ted Leonsis, and Donn Davis; Grotech Ventures; and SWaN & Legend Venture Partners, which was co-founded by Fredrick D. Schaufeld. Optoro was Revolution Growth's fifth investment in its "speed-ups" investment fund, which was created to support the growth of newly formed companies and to widen the audience for their products.

In December 2014, Optoro closed $50 million in funding in a Series C round led by Kleiner Perkins Caufield & Byers, a Silicon Valley venture capital firm, as well as Generation Investment Management, a VC company founded by Al Gore. The financing from KPCB came from its Green Growth Fund.

In July 2015, Optoro received $40 million in debt financing from TriplePoint Venture Growth and Square 1 Bank to support scaling its software and its consumer base.

In December 2016, Optoro raised $30 million in Series D funding from UPS, Revolution Growth, Kleiner Perkins Caufield & Byers, Generation Investment Management, Tenfore Holdings, SWaN and Legend Venture Partners and the Maryland Venture Fund.

Awards 
 2013, Deloitte's Technology Fast 500, #278
 2014, Deloitte's Technology Fast 500, #229
 2015, Deloitte's Technology Fast 500, #308
 2015, Washingtonians 100 Top Tech Leaders, Tobin Moore and Adam Vitarello
 2015, CNBC Disruptor 50 List, #38 
 2015, Ernst & Young's Greater Washington's Entrepreneur of the Year in the Emerging Growth category, Tobin Moore and Adam Vitarello
 2016, World Economic Forum's Ecolab Award for Circular Economy Enterprise
 2016, Deloitte's Technology Fast 500, #266

References

2004 establishments in Rhode Island
American companies established in 2004
Software companies based in Washington, D.C.
Software companies of the United States